Tragocephala pretiosa is a species of beetle in the family Cerambycidae. It was described by Hintz in 1909. It is known from Tanzania, Malawi, Kenya, and Zambia.

Varietas
 Tragocephala pretiosa var. mixta Breuning, 1934
 Tragocephala pretiosa var. kulzeri Breuning, 1934

References

pretiosa
Beetles described in 1909